Coleophora laticornella, the pecan cigar casebearer, is a moth of the family Coleophoridae. It is found in North America.

The wingspan is about 25 mm.

The larvae feed on Carya illinoinensis and other Carya species, as well as on Juglans nigra and Prunus americana. They create a spatulate leaf case.

References

laticornella
Moths described in 1860
Moths of North America